Morten Søgård (born 3 December 1956, in Brumunddal) won the Men's World Curling Championships (Lausanne, Switzerland) and the Winter Olympic Games Curling (Calgary, Canada) competitions in 1988. Eigil Ramsfjell, skip, Sjur Loen, Morten Soegaard, Bo Bakke and Gunnar Meland (alt.) played on the team in both competitions.

Morten Soergaard is currently working as a Sales and Marketing Director for ErgoGroup.

References

External links

1956 births
Norwegian male curlers
Living people
World curling champions
Norwegian curling champions